Carlow Castle is located near to the River Barrow in County Carlow, Ireland. It was built between 1207 and 1213, and is a National Monument of Ireland.

History and Architecture 
The earliest written record of this castle is from 1231 but it does not name its builder. It is widely assumed that the castle was built by William Marshal the elder in the time period between 1207 and 1213 which he spent in Ireland. The castle in Carlow was the very first of its kind in Ireland, a towered keep, where a huge rectangular tower is surrounded by four smaller three-quarter-circular towers at the corners of the rectangle. However, there have been doubts that the castle in Carlow supported the traditional function of a keep, i.e. to serve as a refuge of last resort. Instead it deliberately diverted from the contemporary standard in England and continental Europe, i.e. there is no towered curtain, no gate house, and no undivided great hall. Similar castles of the same period were erected in Ferns, Lea, and Terryglass.

The inner castle had three storeys and timber was used for the upper storeys. The long west wall provided stairways and two latrines. The latter indicates that the space was divided. The entrance door was in the first floor but is now broken out.

The castle was handed over to the crown in 1306, granted in 1312 to Thomas Plantagenet, confiscated by the crown in 1537 as the landlords were absent, bought by the Earl of Thomond in 1616, changed hands multiple times until it was taken by Oliver Cromwell in 1650 but was later returned to the Earl of Thomond. In 1814 the castle was widely destroyed in an attempt to create more space for the conversion into a lunatic asylum with the help of explosives. Just the outer face of the west wall and the two neighbouring towers could be preserved.

Literature

See also

 Castles in Great Britain and Ireland
 List of castles in Ireland

References

Buildings and structures in Carlow (town)
Castles in County Carlow
National Monuments in County Carlow
Ruins in the Republic of Ireland